In the United States Marine Corps, the ground combat element (GCE) is the land force of a Marine Air-Ground Task Force (MAGTF). It provides power projection and force for the MAGTF.

Role within the MAGTF
The ground combat element (GCE), composed primarily of infantry units (infantry battalions organized into battalion landing teams, regimental combat teams, and Marine divisions). These organizations contain a headquarters unit that provides command and control (management and planning for manpower, intelligence, operations and training, and logistics functions) as well as scout/sniper, aviation liaison/forward air controller, NBC defense, communications, service (supply, motor transport, weapons maintenance, and dining facility), and Navy combat medical and chaplain's corps personnel. The GCE also contains combat support units, including artillery, armor (tank, assault amphibian, and light armored reconnaissance), combat engineer, and reconnaissance units. At the division level, the GCE also contains limited organic combat service support, including a truck company, a military police/law enforcement company, and the division band.

U.S. Marine Corps Infantry

Marine Infantry Battalions
	  		 
As the largest component of the GCE, Marine infantry is essentially multi-purpose, heavily manned and equipped, light infantry (e.g., a Marine rifle squad having 13 Marines, vs. nine soldiers in an U.S. Army rifle squad). With three rifle companies that are over 40% larger, plus a weapons company, and an additional 100 members in its Headquarters and Service Company (as compared to the TO&E of an Army light infantry battalion), the Marine infantry battalion contains approximately 970 members as compared to approximately 560 in an Army light infantry battalion.
	  		  	
Marine infantry battalions that are reinforced to form a Battalion Landing Team (BLT) are also very heavily supported (as compared to Army light infantry) with additional organic assets. This combat support includes: a field artillery howitzer battery containing a firing platoon of six 155mm howitzers, plus three reinforced armored vehicle platoons (including one each of amphibious assault vehicles, main battle tanks, and light armored reconnaissance vehicles), and one platoon each of infantry reconnaissance and combat engineers.
 	
While primarily trained, organized and equipped to be foot-mobile, Marine infantry is of course, prepared to execute amphibious operations, either by Amphibious Assault Vehicle (AAV-P7-A1), Landing Craft Air Cushion (LCAC), Rigid-Hulled Inflatable Boat (RHIB/RIB), Rigid buoyant boat (RBB), or conventional landing craft such as the Landing Craft Utility (LCU 1466/1610/1627) and Landing Craft Mechanized (LCM-8), etc. In addition, all Marine infantry units are prepared, and regularly train, to perform heliborne, or "vertical envelopment" (i.e., air assault) operations when supported by MV-22 medium tiltrotor and/or CH-53 heavy helicopters and mechanized operations (when supported by attached amphibious assault vehicle units). Additionally, some Marine infantrymen (usually only those assigned to reconnaissance or special operations units) attend U.S. Army Airborne or Ranger training. However, since the USMC does not maintain either airborne or Ranger infantry units, only a relatively small number of Marines ever attend these two schools.
	
Furthermore, while not designated as special operations forces, deployed Marine Expeditionary Units (containing a heavily reinforced Marine infantry battalion, consisting of approximately 1,200 Marines and Navy personnel, designated as a BLT) are certified as capable of performing some ""special operations"" type missions. In addition to significant differences between Marine infantry and their US Army counterparts in training and organization, there are some differences in individual weapons, equipment, and vehicles, as well.
	  	
The Marine Corps conducts infantry training at three locations:
	  	
 The Basic School, Marine Corps Base Quantico, VA (for officers)	
 School of Infantry (East), Camp Lejeune, NC (for enlisted Marines) 	
 School of Infantry (West), Camp Pendleton, CA (for enlisted Marines)
	  	
Current Marine Infantry Organization
	 
1st Marine Division (3 Marine infantry regiments containing 9 Marine infantry battalions) 
2nd Marine Division (3 Marine infantry regiments containing 9 Marine infantry battalions)
3rd Marine Division (2 Marine infantry regiments containing 6 Marine infantry battalions)
4th Marine Division (2 Marine infantry regiments containing 8 Marine infantry battalions)

Organization
The size of the GCE varies in proportion to the size of the MAGTF. A Marine Expeditionary Force has a division (MARDIV). A Marine Expeditionary Brigade holds an infantry regiment, reinforced with equipment and personnel from various divisional combat support regiments (i.e., artillery) and battalions (e.g., armor). The various Marine Expeditionary Units command a reinforced infantry battalion, which includes various combat support unit attachments. Generally, MEF postings are permanent, while MEBs and MEUs rotate their GCE, ACE, and LCE twice annually.

Hierarchy of Marine ground units

1st Marine Division

1st Marine Regiment

5th Marine Regiment

7th Marine Regiment

11th Marine Regiment

Other 1st Marine Division battalions

2nd Marine Division

2nd Marine Regiment

6th Marine Regiment

10th Marine Regiment

Other 2nd Marine Division battalions

3rd Marine Division

3rd Marine Regiment

4th Marine Regiment

12th Marine Regiment

Other 3rd Marine Division battalions

4th Marine Division

14th Marine Regiment

23rd Marine Regiment

25th Marine Regiment

Other 4th Marine Division battalions

See also

 Air Naval Gunfire Liaison Company
 Combined Anti-Armor Team
 Mobile Assault Platoon
 Radio Battalion
 Radio Reconnaissance Platoon

References

 

United States Marine Corps organization